New York Central 2933 is 4-8-2 "Mohawk", (Mountain), type steam locomotive built in 1929 by the American Locomotive Company for the New York Central Railroad. The wheel arrangement is known as the Mountain type on other railroads, but the New York Central dubbed them "Mohawks" after the Mohawk River, which the railroad followed. It pulled freight trains until being retired in 1955. Today, the locomotive is on display at the National Museum of Transportation in Kirkwood, Missouri. It is the second-largest New York Central steam locomotive still in existence and is one of two surviving New York Central "Mohawks"; the other, No. 3001, is on display at the National New York Central Railroad Museum in Elkhart, Indiana.

History

It was originally built for the Big Four Railroad and was numbered 6233, it was renumbered 2933 in 1936 when the locomotive was transferred to the New York Central.

New York Central No. 2933 is a member of class L-2d. It powered freight trains until retirement in 1955.

Preservation
The locomotive was reportedly used as a stationary steam boiler in the NYC shops before it was placed in storage. After a request penned by the Kirkwood, Missouri (St. Louis suburb) museum director in 1962, it was donated to the Museum of Transportation there.  It had somehow previously escaped the order by then-NYC President Alfred E. Perlman to scrap all steam locomotives, which was accomplished by 1957. This made it the only large New York Central steam locomotive to be donated directly by the railroad.

In May 2017, the museum completed a 10-year-long full cosmetic restoration of the engine.

See also
 New York Central 3001 - Another surviving Mohawk and the largest surviving New York Central steam locomotive.

Footnotes

References
 
 
 Keefe, Kevin. 2017. 

New York Central Railroad locomotives
4-8-2 locomotives
ALCO locomotives
Railway locomotives introduced in 1929
Individual locomotives of the United States
Standard gauge locomotives of the United States
Preserved steam locomotives of Missouri